Wolfgang Amadeus Mozart composed his String Quartet No. 22 in B-flat major, K. 589 after a visit to the court of King Friedrich Wilhelm II, King of Prussia. Mozart traveled with his friend and piano student Prince Carl Lichnowsky, and during these travels they had the opportunity to stop in Potsdam and hold an audience for Mozart at the King's court. Mozart was under financial stress and had hopes of having a position at the court of King Wilhelm II. Wilhelm was an amateur cellist and these "Prussian Quartets", of which the String Quartet No. 22 is a part, feature an unusually prominent role for the cello. Despite such compositional efforts by Mozart to gain employment from the king, these quartets were sold without any dedication and published by Ataria.

Financial Stress 
During the inception of the quartet, Mozart was under financial strain. He was in debt to the publisher Ataria, had a failed subscription deal with that publisher, was in debt to his landlord, and had arguments over his debts with a pawnbroker. It was under these circumstances that he had his audience with King Friedrich Wilhelm II. The choice of Mozart to compose a prominent role for the cello seemingly was a strategic choice as the King himself was an amateur cellist. Mozart was indeed not employed at the Prussian court nor did the quartets ever receive a dedicatee. Mozart sold these quartets to Ataria so that, as he said in personal letters, "[He] could have cash in hand for [his] difficulties". These financial difficulties explain why Mozart highlighted the cello in this piece. These reasons also contribute to the quartet's character and style differ from the other late quartets of Mozart.

Movements

Allegro 

The first movement is marked Allegro and is in B-flat Major. It is in sonata form. The opening primary theme is marked by descending sixteenths. The phrase structure is a six-bar phrase rather than the typical four or eight that are characteristic of Mozart. The secondary theme in F major is uniquely introduced in the cello, higher in the instrument's register. The statement of the secondary theme in the cello is an example of Mozart's hopes of employment from the amateur-cellist-king appearing in his writing. The theme is marked by cascading eighth note gestures and syncopated rhythms.

Larghetto 

The second movement is marked larghetto and in the key of E-flat major. The time signature is in cut time and the theme is first presented in the cello-yet another instance of this quartet's historical context appearing in the composition. As in the first movement, the part is higher in the register for the cello. The theme is marked sotto voce.

Menuetto and Trio 

The third movement is a minuet and trio with the tempo marking being moderato. The minuet is in B-flat major and the trio is in E-flat major. The first violin states the main thematic material of this movement and the other instruments accompany with ostinato figures. While the cello isn't given large thematic material as in the previous movements, the cello is given the final note of both sections of the trio without any other voice playing.

Allegro Assai 

The final movement is marked allegro assai and is in six-eight time. The movement is composed as a rondo. The key is B-flat major and the movement is a jig-like melody first presented in the first and second violins and then shared across the quartet. Each of the motives of this movement are played in all voices and overall is very equal in its voicing.

References

External links
 
 

22
Compositions in B-flat major
1790 compositions